Pablo Mariaselvam (born 1897 in Trichinopoly) was an Indian clergyman and prelate for the Roman Catholic Diocese of Vellore. He was appointed bishop in 1953. He died in 1954.

References 

1897 births
1954 deaths
Indian Roman Catholic bishops